John Nelson Goss (born 1 January 1943) is a former Australian politician. He was the Liberal member for Aspley in the Legislative Assembly of Queensland from 1989 to 2001.

Goss was born in Brisbane and attended the Queensland Institute of Technology, receiving a Certificate in Civil Engineering Drafting. He served on Brisbane City Council from 1982 to 1989. He left the council in 1989 to stand for election to the Queensland Parliament, winning Aspley for the Liberal Party. He became the Liberal Party's spokesman for Transport and Administrative Services in February 1990, exchanging Administrative Services for Housing in August. Following the resumption of the Coalition between the Liberal and National parties, he became Shadow Minister for Housing, Planning and Urban Transport in November 1992. He was not appointed to the ministry when the Coalition won government in 1995, serving as a backbencher until 2000, when he became Shadow Minister for Fair Trading and Consumer Affairs. He was defeated at the 2001 state election.

References

1943 births
Living people
Liberal Party of Australia members of the Parliament of Queensland
Members of the Queensland Legislative Assembly
21st-century Australian politicians